Saint John's School is a private coeducational school located in the Condado neighborhood of San Juan, Puerto Rico.  It has students from pre-kindergarten to the 12th grade.

Background

Saint John's School is a non-profit, college preparatory, nonsectarian, coeducational day school founded in 1915.  The school has an enrollment of over 800 students from pre pre-kindergarten to grade twelve.  Instruction is mostly in English with the exception of language courses.  Technology in the classroom includes tablets, laptops and smart boards.

Academics

Elementary School (Pre-Pre-Kinder through Grade 6)
Traditional subjects such as reading and writing, mathematics, social studies, and science are organized by themes.  The Spanish language program begins in PPK.  Spanish as a Second Language instruction also is offered.  Students have a computer literacy program, a physical development program based on the concept of “wellness”, and an integrated arts program including art, music, and performing arts. Community service projects are integrated into the academic programs.

Secondary School (Grades 7 through 12)
For grades seven and eight, every student takes the core academic classes of English, math, social studies, science, and Spanish.  Physical education classes meet daily.  In addition, all students take a number of exploratory classes that include visual and performing arts, technology, writing workshop, and research.  Algebra I is offered to all eighth graders with a simultaneous class in math enrichment for those who need extra support. Each grade does community service projects a few times a year.

Students in grades nine through twelve follow a college preparatory curriculum enriched by electives and advanced placement courses.  Advanced placement courses are usually offered in English literature, Spanish literature, French language, biology, chemistry, physics, calculus, economics, psychology, human geography, United States history and European history. Elective courses usually offered include anatomy and physiology, contemporary communications, art, film analysis, French, Hispanic culture, French culture and journalism.

AP Courses Offered

Humanities 
AP Human Geography, AP Language and Composition, AP Psychology, AP European History, AP United States History, AP Government and Politics

STEM 
AP Physics I, AP Physics II, AP Chemistry, AP Biology, AP Computer Science A, AP Computer Science Principles, AP Statistics, AP Calculus AB, AP Calculus BC

Advanced non-AP Courses 
Multivariable Calculus (taken by only one person in 2015)

Athletics
Saint John's is an active member of the LAMEPI league at the elementary level and the PRHSAA at the middle and high school level.  Mini, Juvenile, Junior Varsity and Varsity teams usually include girls’ and boys’ cross country, soccer, volleyball, basketball, swimming, tennis, and indoor soccer.  Sailing is offered to students from grades five through eight as an exploratory program.

As part of the intramural program, there is a volleyball and basketball infantile league which includes first through fourth grade girls’ and boys’.

Facilities
Saint John's includes an elementary school complex with specialized areas for art, music, performing arts, computers and science, and a secondary building which contains science laboratories and a technology center.  The library facilities include separate areas for elementary and secondary students.  Each classroom is equipped with a computer and a monitor.  All math and science classrooms are also equipped with projectors and a smart board. The school's  gymnasium is used by all students.  The school cafeteria serves breakfast, lunch, and snacks each day.

Administrative and Business Offices are housed in Casa Marbella.  Admissions and Development Offices, as well as additional high school classrooms, can be found in The Annex.

STEM Extracurriculars

MathCounts 
The school has a club for middle schoolers in grades 6–8 to participate annually in the MATHCOUNTS Competition. Weekly trainings take place on Thursdays with a coach and coach assistant to help out the mathletes

Math Bowl Participation 
High School members grades 9th-12th annually compete in statewide team math bowl participations in schools around the island such as Marista, Seso, and Perpetuo Socorro usually with a team captain and 2 to 3 teammates. Mathletes train weekly together or individually for competitions that cover from Algebra II to Pre-algebra.

Science Bowl 
The SJS Science bowl consists of high schoolers from 9th to 12th grade who practice weekly on Thursday afternoons with buzzers. They annually compete in the Mayaguez Science Bowl in two teams, team A and B with a team captain for each to answer short answer questions. They also compete in the annual SESO Science bowl, in teams of 4, each with a team captain to direct the team members.

Other Clubs and Activities

School Band 
The school teamed up with the Conservatory of Puerto Rico in 2015 to bring a school band consisting of flute, clarinet, saxophones, trombones, trumpets, piano, drums, electric bass, and guitar.

The band performs annually at the School's Noche Puertorriqueno (Puerto Rican Night) and at the end of the year.  They have performed at the Conservatory of Puerto Rico in December 2015.

MIT LaunchX Club 
Started in 2017, the club consists of student entrepreneurs teaming up in groups, giving high school students the skills and mindset to start real companies.

External links
 Official website
 Official Facebook
 Official Twitter

Educational institutions established in 1915
Private schools in Puerto Rico
1915 establishments in Puerto Rico
Education in San Juan, Puerto Rico